Jay is the debut studio album by Taiwanese singer Jay Chou, released on 7 November 2000 by BMG Taiwan.

The album was nominated for five Golden Melody Awards and won for Best Pop Vocal Album. The album also won an IFPI Hong Kong Top Sales Music Award for Top 10 Best Selling Mandarin Albums of the Year.

The track, "Adorable Lady", is listed at number 74 on the 2000s Hit FM Top 100 Singles of the Year chart. The track, "Starry Mood", is also listed at number 80 on the 2001's chart.

Track listing

Awards

References

External links
  Jay Chou discography@JVR Music

2000 debut albums
Bertelsmann Music Group albums
Jay Chou albums